Georg Damjanoff (born 12 October 1945) is a retired German footballer.

References

External links
 

1945 births
Living people
German footballers
Tennis Borussia Berlin players
MSV Duisburg players
Arminia Bielefeld players
Hannover 96 players
SpVgg Bayreuth players
VfB Oldenburg players
Bundesliga players
2. Bundesliga players
Association football defenders
Association football midfielders